Mahmudiyeh (also Romanized as Maḩmūdīyeh; also known as Deh Now and Mahmoodiyeh) is a village in Razmavaran Rural District, in the Central District of Rafsanjan County, Kerman Province, Iran. At the 2006 census, its population was 22, in 5 families.

References 

Populated places in Rafsanjan County